Katherine Johnson (August 26, 1918February 24, 2020) was an American mathematician whose calculations of orbital mechanics as a NASA employee were critical to the success of the first and subsequent U.S. crewed spaceflights. During her 33-year career at NASA and its predecessor, she earned a reputation for mastering complex manual calculations and helped pioneer the use of computers to perform the tasks. The space agency noted her "historical role as one of the first African-American women to work as a NASA scientist".

Johnson's work included calculating trajectories, launch windows, and emergency return paths for Project Mercury spaceflights, including those for astronauts Alan Shepard, the first American in space, and John Glenn, the first American in orbit, and rendezvous paths for the Apollo Lunar Module and command module on flights to the Moon. Her calculations were also essential to the beginning of the Space Shuttle program, and she worked on plans for a mission to Mars. She was known as a "human computer" for her tremendous mathematical capability and ability to work with space trajectories with such little technology and recognition at the time.

In 2015, President Barack Obama awarded Johnson the Presidential Medal of Freedom. In 2016, she was presented with the Silver Snoopy Award by NASA astronaut Leland D. Melvin and a NASA Group Achievement Award. She was portrayed by Taraji P. Henson as a lead character in the 2016 film Hidden Figures. In 2019, Johnson was awarded the Congressional Gold Medal by the United States Congress. In 2021, she was inducted posthumously into the National Women's Hall of Fame.

Early life
Katherine Johnson was born as Creola Katherine Coleman on August 26, 1918, in White Sulphur Springs, West Virginia, to Joylette Roberta (née Lowe) and Joshua McKinley Coleman. She was the youngest of four children. Her mother was a teacher and her father was a lumberman, farmer, and handyman. He also worked at the Greenbrier Hotel.

Johnson showed strong mathematical abilities from an early age. Because Greenbrier County did not offer public schooling for African-American students past the eighth grade, the Colemans arranged for their children to attend high school in Institute, West Virginia. This school was on the campus of West Virginia State College (WVSC); Johnson was enrolled when she was ten years old. The family split their time between Institute during the school year and White Sulphur Springs in the summer.

After graduating from high school at the age of 14, Johnson matriculated at WVSC, a historically black college. She took every course in mathematics offered by the College. Several professors mentored her, including the chemist and mathematician Angie Turner King, who had guided Coleman throughout high school, and W. W. Schieffelin Claytor, the third African-American to receive a doctorate in mathematics. Claytor added new mathematics courses just for Johnson. She graduated summa cum laude in 1937, with degrees in mathematics and French, at age 18. Johnson was a member of Alpha Kappa Alpha. She took on a teaching job at a black public school in Marion, Virginia.

In 1939, after marrying her first husband, James Goble, she left her teaching job and enrolled in a graduate math program. She quit at the end of the first session and chose to focus on her family life. She was the first African-American woman to attend graduate school at West Virginia University in Morgantown, West Virginia. Through WVSC's president, Dr. John W. Davis, she became one of three African-American students, and the only woman, selected to integrate the graduate school after the 1938 United States Supreme Court ruling in Missouri ex rel. Gaines v. Canada required States which provided public higher education to white students to provide it to black students as well, either by establishing black colleges and universities or by admitting black students to previously white-only universities.

Career

Johnson decided on a career as a research mathematician, although this was a difficult field for African Americans and women to enter. The first jobs she found were in teaching. At a family gathering in 1952, a relative mentioned that the National Advisory Committee for Aeronautics (NACA) was hiring mathematicians. At the Langley Memorial Aeronautical Laboratory, based in Hampton, Virginia, near Langley Field, NACA hired African-American mathematicians as well as whites for their Guidance and Navigation Department. Johnson accepted a job offer from the agency in June 1953.

According to an oral history archived by the National Visionary Leadership Project:

At first she [Johnson] worked in a pool of women performing math calculations. Katherine has referred to the women in the pool as virtual "computers who wore skirts". Their main job was to read the data from the plane's black boxes and carry out other precise mathematical tasks. Then one day, Katherine (and a colleague) were temporarily assigned to help the all-male flight research team. Katherine's knowledge of analytic geometry helped make quick allies of male bosses and colleagues to the extent that, "they forgot to return me to the pool".  While the racial and gender barriers were always there, Katherine ignored them. Katherine was assertive, asking to be included in editorial meetings (where no women had gone before). She simply told people she had done the work and that she belonged.

From 1953 to 1958, Johnson worked as a computer, analyzing topics such as gust alleviation for aircraft. Originally assigned to the West Area Computers section supervised by mathematician Dorothy Vaughan, Johnson was reassigned to the Guidance and Control Division of Langley's Flight Research Division. It was staffed by white male engineers. In keeping with the State of Virginia's racial segregation laws, and federal workplace segregation introduced under President Woodrow Wilson in the early 20th century, Johnson and the other African-American women in the computing pool were required to work, eat, and use restrooms that were separate from those of their white peers. Their office was labeled as "Colored Computers". In an interview with WHRO-TV, Johnson stated that she "didn't feel the segregation at NASA, because everybody there was doing research. You had a mission and you worked on it, and it was important to you to do your job ... and play bridge at lunch." She added: "I didn't feel any segregation. I knew it was there, but I didn't feel it."

NACA disbanded the colored computing pool in 1958 when the agency was superseded by NASA, which adopted digital computers. Although the installation was desegregated, forms of discrimination were still pervasive. Johnson recalled that era:

We needed to be assertive as women in that days – assertive and aggressive – and the degree to which we had to be that way depended on where you were. I had to be. In the early days of NASA women were not allowed to put their names on the reports – no woman in my division had had her name on a report. I was working with Ted Skopinski and he wanted to leave and go to Houston ... but Henry Pearson, our supervisor – he was not a fan of women – kept pushing him to finish the report we were working on. Finally, Ted told him, "Katherine should finish the report, she's done most of the work anyway." So Ted left Pearson with no choice; I finished the report and my name went on it, and that was the first time a woman in our division had her name on something.

From 1958 until her retirement in 1986, Johnson worked as an aerospace technologist, moving during her career to the Spacecraft Controls Branch. She calculated the trajectory for the May 5, 1961, space flight of Alan Shepard, the first American in space. She also calculated the launch window for his 1961 Mercury mission. She plotted backup navigation charts for astronauts in case of electronic failures. When NASA used electronic computers for the first time to calculate John Glenn's orbit around Earth, officials called on Johnson to verify the computer's numbers; Glenn had asked for her specifically and had refused to fly unless Johnson verified the calculations. Biography.com states these were "far more difficult calculations, to account for the gravitational pulls of celestial bodies".

Author Margot Lee Shetterly stated, "So the astronaut who became a hero, looked to this black woman in the still-segregated South at the time as one of the key parts of making sure his mission would be a success." She added that, in a time where computing was "women's work" and engineering was left to men, "it really does have to do with us over the course of time sort of not valuing that work that was done by women, however necessary, as much as we might. And it has taken history to get a perspective on that."

Johnson later worked directly with digital computers. Her ability and reputation for accuracy helped to establish confidence in the new technology. In 1961, her work helped to ensure that Alan Shepard's Freedom 7 Mercury capsule would be found quickly after landing, using the accurate trajectory that had been established.

She also helped to calculate the trajectory for the 1969 Apollo 11 flight to the Moon. During the Moon landing, Johnson was at a meeting in the Pocono Mountains. She and a few others crowded around a small television screen watching the first steps on the Moon. In 1970, Johnson worked on the Apollo 13 Moon mission. When the mission was aborted, her work on backup procedures and charts helped set a safe path for the crew's return to Earth, creating a one-star observation system that would allow astronauts to determine their location with accuracy. In a 2010 interview, Johnson recalled, "Everybody was concerned about them getting there. We were concerned about them getting back." Later in her career, Johnson worked on the Space Shuttle program, the Earth Resources Satellite, and on plans for a mission to Mars.

Johnson spent her later years encouraging students to enter the fields of science, technology, engineering, and mathematics (STEM).

Personal life and death
Katherine and James Francis Goble had three daughters. The family lived in Newport News, Virginia, from 1953. James died of an inoperable brain tumor in 1956 and, three years later, Katherine married James A. "Jim" Johnson, a United States Army officer and veteran of the Korean War; the pair were married for 60 years until his death in March 2019 at the age of 93. Johnson, who had six grandchildren and 11 great-grandchildren, lived in Hampton, Virginia. She encouraged her grandchildren and students to pursue careers in science and technology.

She was a member of Carver Memorial Presbyterian Church for 50 years, where she sang as part of the choir. She was also a member of the Alpha Kappa Alpha Sorority.

Johnson died at a retirement home in Newport News on February 24, 2020, at age 101. Following her death, Jim Bridenstine, NASA's administrator, described her as "an American hero" and stated that "her pioneering legacy will never be forgotten."

Legacy and honors

Johnson co-authored 26 scientific papers. Her social influence as a pioneer in space science and computing is demonstrated by the honors she received and her status as a role model for a life in science. Johnson was named West Virginia State College Outstanding Alumnus of the Year in 1999. President Barack Obama presented her with the Presidential Medal of Freedom, one of 17 Americans so honored on November 24, 2015. She was cited as a pioneering example of African-American women in STEM. President Obama said at the time, "Katherine G. Johnson refused to be limited by society's expectations of her gender and race while expanding the boundaries of humanity's reach." NASA noted her "historical role as one of the first African-American women to work as a NASA scientist."

Two NASA facilities have been named in her honor. On May 5, 2016, a new  building was named the "Katherine G. Johnson Computational Research Facility" and formally dedicated at the agency's Langley Research Center in Hampton, Virginia. The facility officially opened its doors on September 22, 2017. Johnson attended this event, which also marked the 55th anniversary of astronaut Alan Shepard's historic rocket launch and splashdown, a success Johnson helped achieve. At the ceremony, deputy director Lewin said this about Johnson: "Millions of people around the world watched Shepard's flight, but what they didn't know at the time was that the calculations that got him into space and safely home were done by today's guest of honor, Katherine Johnson". During the event, Johnson also received a Silver Snoopy award; often called the astronaut's award, NASA stated it is given to those "who have made outstanding contributions to flight safety and mission success". NASA renamed the Independent Verification and Validation Facility, in Fairmont, West Virginia, to the Katherine Johnson Independent Verification and Validation Facility on February 22, 2019.

Johnson was included on the BBC's list of 100 Women of influence worldwide in 2016. In a 2016 video NASA stated, "Her calculations proved as critical to the success of the Apollo Moon landing program and the start of the Space Shuttle program, as they did to those first steps on the country's journey into space."

Science writer Maia Weinstock developed a prototype Lego for Women of NASA in 2016 and included Johnson; she declined to have her likeness printed on the final product. On May 12, 2018, she was awarded an honorary doctorate by the College of William & Mary. In August 2018, West Virginia State University established a STEM scholarship in honor of Johnson and erected a life-size statue of her on campus. Mattel announced a Barbie doll in Johnson's likeness with a NASA identity badge in 2018. In 2019, Johnson was announced as one of the members of the inaugural class of Government Executive  Government Hall of Fame.

In June 2019, George Mason University named the most prominent building on their SciTech campus, the Katherine G. Johnson Hall.

In 2020, Bethel School District, Washington, named its newest school the Katherine G. Johnson Elementary.

On November 2, 2020, Fairfax County Public Schools—the largest school division in the Commonwealth of Virginia and 12th largest school division in the United States, and the City of Fairfax, Virginia, announced that the latter's school board had voted to rename its middle school, previously named after Confederate soldier, poet, and musician Sidney Lanier to Katherine Johnson Middle School (KJMS), after 85 percent of its residents voiced their support in favor.

On November 6, 2020, a satellite named after her (ÑuSat 15 or "Katherine", COSPAR 2020-079G) was launched into space. In February 2021, Northrop Grumman named its Cygnus NG-15 spacecraft to supply the International Space Station the SS Katherine Johnson in her honor.

In 2021, San Juan Unified School District, in Sacramento, California named its newest school Katherine Johnson Middle School.

Depiction in media 
The film Hidden Figures, released in December 2016, was based on the non-fiction book of the same title by Margot Lee Shetterly, which was published earlier that year. It follows Johnson and other female African-American mathematicians (Mary Jackson and Dorothy Vaughan) who worked at NASA. Taraji P. Henson plays Johnson in the film. Appearing alongside Henson at the 89th Academy Awards, Johnson received a standing ovation from the audience. In an earlier interview, Johnson offered the following comment about the movie: "It was well done. The three leading ladies did an excellent job portraying us." In a 2016 episode of the NBC series Timeless, titled "Space Race", the mathematician is portrayed by Nadine Ellis.

Awards

 1971, 1980, 1984, 1985, 1986: NASA Langley Research Center Special Achievement award
1977, NASA Group Achievement Award presented to the Lunar Spacecraft and Operations team – for pioneering work in the field of navigation supporting the spacecraft that orbited and mapped the Moon in preparation for the Apollo program
 1998, Honorary Doctor of Laws, from SUNY Farmingdale
 1999, West Virginia State College Outstanding Alumnus of the Year
 2006, Honorary Doctor of Science by the Capitol College, Laurel, Maryland
 2010, Honorary Doctorate of Science from Old Dominion University, Norfolk, Virginia
 2014, De Pizan Honor from National Women's History Museum
 2015, NCWIT Pioneer in Tech Award
 2015, Presidential Medal of Freedom
 2016, Silver Snoopy award from Leland Melvin
 2016, Astronomical Society of the Pacific's Arthur B.C. Walker II Award
 2016, Presidential Honorary Doctorate of Humane Letters from West Virginia University, Morgantown, West Virginia
On December 1, 2016, Johnson received the Langley West Computing Unit NASA Group Achievement Award at a reception at the Virginia Air and Space Center. Other awardees included her colleagues, Dorothy Vaughan, and Mary Jackson.
2017, Daughters of the American Revolution (DAR) Medal of Honor
 2017 Honorary Doctorate from Spelman College
 May 12, 2018, Honorary Doctorate of Science from the College of William & Mary, Williamsburg, Virginia
 On April 29, 2019, the University of Johannesburg and its Faculty of Science conferred Johnson with the degree of Philosophiae Doctor Honoris causa for her pioneering role at NASA.
November 8, 2019, Congressional Gold Medal
2021, Induction into the National Women's Hall of Fame

See also
Annie Easley, mathematician
List of African-American women in STEM fields
List of West Virginia University alumni
Mathematical Tables Project, pioneering human computer group
Timeline of women in science

References

Further reading
 Beverly Golemba, Human Computers: The Women in Aeronautical Research, unpublished manuscript 1994, NASA Langley Archives.
 Brigham Narins, Notable Scientists: From 1900 to the Present, Gale Group, 2001, .

External links

Katherine G. Johnson Video produced by Makers: Women Who Make America
 What Matters; Katherine Johnson: NASA Pioneer and "Computer" WHRO, American Archive of Public Broadcasting (GBH and the Library of Congress), Boston, MA and Washington, DC

1918 births
2020 deaths
African-American mathematicians
African-American schoolteachers
Schoolteachers from West Virginia
American computer scientists
Presbyterians from Virginia
American women mathematicians
20th-century American mathematicians
21st-century American mathematicians
NASA people
West Area Computers
People from Hampton, Virginia
People from White Sulphur Springs, West Virginia
Scientists from West Virginia
West Virginia State University alumni
West Virginia University alumni
American women computer scientists
African-American computer scientists
Congressional Gold Medal recipients
Presidential Medal of Freedom recipients
American women physicists
20th-century American physicists
21st-century American physicists
20th-century American women scientists
21st-century American women scientists
BBC 100 Women
American centenarians
African-American centenarians
20th-century women mathematicians
21st-century women mathematicians
Mathematicians from Virginia
Women centenarians
20th-century American educators
20th-century American women educators
21st-century African-American people
21st-century African-American women